We Ate the Machine is the eighth full-length studio album from Japanese new wave act Polysics. The album was released in April 2008 in Japan and in September 2008 in the U.S. The U.S. version features re-recorded English language vocals on some of the songs.

The album includes the singles "Pretty Good" and "Rocket".

Track listing

External links
Polysics official website
Polysics official MySpace
Jrawk review of the album

2008 albums
Polysics albums